Cartoon Network is a children's pay television channel in Russia, CIS & Southeast Europe which was launched on 1 October 2009, replacing the pan-European feed of Cartoon Network. Cartoon Network is available in Russian, Bulgarian, English, Serbian, Croatian, and Slovene.

History

Block 
From April 14, 1996 to April 6, 1997, the Russian channel TV-6 has broadcast the Cartoon Network block with the channel's bumpers voiced into Russian, as well as two multi—part projects - the animated series The Jetsons and the classic Tom and Jerry short cartoons.

Channel 
In October 1996, Cartoon Network Europe began to be rebroadcast in English by the pay-TV operator Kosmos-TV (owned by an American company Metromedia International), the duration of the broadcasts was not fixed. Broadcasting was carried out from 5:00 to 21:00 Moscow time, and the TNT UK TV channel was broadcast in the evening. In October 1999, the channel "TCM Europe" began broadcasting during non-working airtime instead of "TNT UK".

On November 1, 1999, the channel Cartoon Network Europe officially began broadcasting on the territory of Russia and in the CIS and Baltic countries on the platform of the satellite operator NTV-Plus and in other cable networks, broadcasting from the Sirius satellite 2 (partially duplicated). Broadcasting was from 8:00 to 00:00 Moscow time, and at night the TV channel "TCM Europe" was broadcast. The distributor of the channel in the CIS and the Baltic States was "Chello Zone".

On April 1, 2005, Cartoon Network Europe received a full-fledged Russian soundtrack. 

In mid-May 2006, a rebranding was carried out, which included an updated version of the logo and a new design. Later, the "Cartoon Network Cinema" block appeared.

In 2008, a representative office of Turner Broadcasting System Russia opened in Moscow, which began distributing the channel. Later, the channel was legally renamed "Cartoon Network Pan-European".

On October 1, 2009, its own version of the TV channel appeared — Cartoon Network Russia and Southeastern Europe (CN RSEE), broadcasting in the CIS, Baltic States and Southeastern Europe. There is also a new block "Cartoon Toon Toon". During the break, advertising for the CIS countries and Bulgaria is different.

On November 26, 2010, a new corporate identity was introduced, as well as a new design. In the same year, a website was launched - cartoonnetwork.ru and cartoonnetwork.bg, the site is controlled and maintained in London.

Since March 2011, the channel has switched to round-the-clock broadcasting, the broadcast of "TCM Europe" on the frequency of "Cartoon Network RSEE" has stopped.

In 2014 , Munich took over the programming and management of the TV channel, It was previously managed in London. In the same year, the "Marathon Mix" block appeared.

At the end of 2015, it became known that the distributor of the channel in Russia and the CIS would be Media Alliance, a subsidiary of the state media holding National Media Group and Discovery Inc. The transaction was completed in May 2016. The company managed the Russian legal entity of the channel — Turner Children's Programs LLC, which was headed by Discovery representative Grigory Lavrov, who was also the general director of Media Alliance.

Since November 18, 2020, the broadcasting center is now located in Prague, but the editorial office has remained in Munich

On 6 November 2021, the channel feed started with dubbing in Serbian, Croatian and Slovene.

On 9 March 2022, the channel has been closed temporarily in Russia, along with Boomerang and Discovery channels, with these closures being a response by WarnerMedia and Discovery Inc. on the actions of the invasion of Ukraine. It continues broadcasting in the CIS and Baltic countries.

From 1 August 2022, some new cartoon series began to be released without Russian dubbing.

References

External links 
Official Site Bulgaria
Russia website

Cartoon Network
Defunct television channels in Russia
Turner Broadcasting System Europe
Turner Broadcasting System Russia
Television channels and stations established in 2009
Television channels in Bulgaria
Television channels in North Macedonia
Television stations in Ukraine
Television stations in Georgia (country)
Television stations in Belarus
Television stations in Kazakhstan
Television stations in Armenia
Television stations in Kyrgyzstan
Television stations in Turkmenistan
Television stations in Montenegro
Television channels in Croatia
Television stations in Serbia
Television channels in Lithuania
Television channels in Estonia
Television stations in Bosnia and Herzegovina
Television channels in Slovenia
Television stations in Kosovo
Children's television channels in North Macedonia
2009 establishments in Russia
2009 establishments in Bulgaria
2009 establishments in Europe
2022 disestablishments in Russia
Television channels in Latvia
Warner Bros. Discovery EMEA
Television stations in Tajikistan
Television stations in Uzbekistan
Television stations in Azerbaijan
Television channels in Moldova